Francesco Tristano Schlimé, stage name Francesco Tristano, born 1981, is a Luxembourgish classical and experimental pianist and composer who also plays the clarinet. He composes both classical and electronic music.

Education

Born on 16 September 1981 in Luxembourg City, Tristano studied at conservatories in Luxembourg, Brussels, Riga and Paris before graduating in music at New York's Juilliard School where his teachers were Jerome Lowenthal, Bruce Brubaker and Jacob Lateiner. He has also studied with Emile Naoumoff, Rosalyn Tureck and Mikhail Pletnev.

Career

He debuted in 2000 with the Russian National Orchestra, with which he recorded Sergey Prokofiev's 5th Piano Concerto and Maurice Ravel's Piano Concerto years later. In 2004 he presented and conducted at the Grand Théâtre de Luxembourg and the Beaux-Arts in Brussels an original transcription/adaptation for piano and strings of Antonio Vivaldi's The Four Seasons. He was nominated by the Philharmonie Luxembourg for the 2008 European Concert Hall Organisation’s Carnegie Hall Rising Stars series.

He is a specialist in Baroque music and contemporary music. In 2001, Tristano founded The New Bach Players ensemble, with which he recorded Johann Sebastian Bach's complete cycle of Keyboard concertos for Accord. He has also recorded the Goldberg Variations and the  French Suites, as well as Girolamo Frescobaldi's 1st book of Toccatas. Very involved in Contemporary music, too, he has recorded Luciano Berio's complete piano works and collaborated with electronic music artists such as Carl Craig and Murcof. He won the 2004 Concours International de piano XXe siècle d'Orléans.

He was a member, with Rami Khalife and Aymeric Westrich, of the Aufgang group, whose eponymous album was released in 2009. Francesco Tristano left Aufgang in February 2014. The trio also released the albums Air on Fire and Istiklaliya. Aufgang is continuing as a duo composed of Rami Khalifé and Aymeric Westrich.

Discography

Albums
 2001 : Goldberg Variations (Accord ACD127-2)
 2006 : Ravel-Piano concerto in G/Prokofiev-Piano concerto no. 5/Schlimé-3 Improvisations (Label PENTATONE PTC 5186080)
 2007 : Not For Piano (Label Infiné)
 2008 : Auricle Bio /On (Label Infiné)
 2010 : Idiosynkrasia (Label Infiné)
 2011 : bachCage (Label Deutsche Grammophon)
 2012 : Long Walk (Label Deutsche Grammophon)
 2017 : Piano Circle Songs (Label Sony Classical)
 2019 : “Tokyo Stories” (Label Sony Classical) 
 2021 : “Supercinema 04” (Label Sony Classical)
 2022: On Early Music (Label Sony Classical)

Maxis
 2006 : Strings of Life (2006 - Label Infiné)
 2010 : The Melody (Label Infiné)
 2011 : Idiosynkrasia Remixes (Label Infiné)
 2011 : Idiosynkrasia (Only Vinyl Edition) (Label Infiné)

Other Projects
 2009 : Aufgang - Aufgang (Album, Label Infiné)
 2009 : Aufgang - Sonar (Maxi, Label Infiné)
 2009 : Aufgang - Channel 7 (Maxi, Label Infiné)
 2010 : Aufgang - Air On Fire (Album, Label Infiné)
 2010 : Aufgang - Barock (Maxi, Label Infiné)
 2010 : Aufgang - Dulceria (Maxi, Label Infiné)
 2013 : Aufgang - Istiklaliya (album, Label Infiné)

Participations
 2010 : Various Artists - Introducing Infiné (Label Infiné)
 2011 : Various Artists - Remixing Infiné (Label Infiné)

References

External links 
Official Website

1981 births
Living people
21st-century pianists
Luxembourgian pianists
Deutsche Grammophon artists
Sunnyside Records artists